Escherichia hermannii is a Gram-negative, rod-shaped species of bacterium.  Strains of this species were originally isolated from human wounds, sputum, and stool. The species is named for American microbiologists George J. Hermann and Lloyd G. Herman.

A 2016 publication proposed reclassifying E. hermannii as a species of a new genus within the Enterobacteriaceae, Atlantibacter, a change which would rename the species to Atlantibacter hermannii.

Pathogenicity
E. hermannii is generally considered nonpathogenic but has been isolated from human wounds, eye infections, and blood.

References

External links 
UniProt Taxonomy: Escherichia hermannii
Type strain of Escherichia hermannii at BacDive -  the Bacterial Diversity Metadatabase

hermannii
Gram-negative bacteria
Bacteria described in 1983